Peter Gary Pearce (born 11 November 1960) is a Welsh director of rugby at Hull RUFC (2000–2005), and dual-code international rugby union and professional rugby league footballer who played in the 1980s and 1990s.

Background
Gary Pearce was born in Laugharne, Wales.

International honours
Gary Pearce won caps for Wales (RU) in 1981 against Ireland, France, and in 1982 against Ireland, and won caps for Wales (RL) while at Scarborough Pirates in 1991 against Papua New Guinea, in 1992 against France, and while at Ryedale-York in 1992 against France. 1991...1992 1(3?)-caps + 3-caps (interchange/substitute) (3-goals? 1-drop-goal? 7-points?).

References

External links
Rugby In Laugharne - Laugharne RFC
Laugharne RFC

1960 births
Living people
Bridgend RFC players
Dual-code rugby internationals
Hull F.C. players
Llanelli RFC players
People from Laugharne
Rugby league five-eighths
Rugby league hookers
Rugby league players from Carmarthenshire
Rugby union players from Carmarthenshire
Scarborough Pirates players
Wales international rugby union players
Wales national rugby league team players
Welsh rugby league players
Welsh rugby union players
York Wasps players